Cheltenham Cemetery, originally the Port Adelaide and Suburban Cemetery, Cheltenham but known as Woodville Cemetery, was established in 1876 by the Port Adelaide Corporation. Funds were allocated for the cemetery by the South Australian colonial administration in 1874. The first recorded burial was Mrs. Hannah Mussared on 27 Jul 1876. There is an Islamic cemetery located nearby too.

Notable interments and cremations
 Dr George Bollen
 David Bower (politician)
 John Carr (Australian politician, born 1871)
 James Luke (Jim) Cavanagh (1913–1990)
 Sarah Francisco
 John Barton Hack
 Ruby Florence Hammond (1936–1993)
 Charles Harrison (Australian politician)
 Joseph Coles Kirby
 F. N. Le Messurier (1891–1966)
 Ivor MacGillivray
 Léon Edmond Mazure (1860–1939)
 Adelaide Miethke
 Victor Herbert Ryan (1874–1956)
 Frederick Furner Ward (1872–1954)
 Thomas Parking (Tom) Willason (1882–1939)
 Norah Magdalene Wilson (1901–1971)

References

External links
 
 

1876 establishments in Australia
Cemeteries in South Australia
Commonwealth War Graves Commission cemeteries in Australia
South Australian Heritage Register